The men's foil was one of seven fencing events on the fencing at the 1956 Summer Olympics programme. It was the twelfth appearance of the event. The competition was held on 26 November 1956. 32 fencers from 14 nations competed. Nations had been limited to three fencers each since 1928. The event was won by Christian d'Oriola of France, the second man to successfully defend an Olympic title in the foil and second man to win three medals in the event (he had a silver medal in 1948 along with gold in 1952). It was France's third consecutive and seventh overall victory in the event. As in 1952, the next two spots were taken by Italians, this time Giancarlo Bergamini and Antonio Spallino.

Background

This was the 12th appearance of the event, which has been held at every Summer Olympics except 1908 (when there was a foil display only rather than a medal event). Four of the nine finalists from 1952 returned: gold medalist (and 1948 silver medalist) Christian d'Oriola of France, silver medalist Edoardo Mangiarotti of Italy, fourth-place finisher Jacques Lataste of France, and eighth-plae finisher Giancarlo Bergamini of Italy. Once again, the French and Italian teams were favored. D'Oriola had added two more world championships since the Helsinki Games and come in second at the third, behind József Gyuricza of Hungary.

The United Team of Germany made its debut in the men's foil. The United States made its 11th appearance, most of any nation, having missed only the inaugural 1896 competition.

Competition format

With a smaller than usual field, the event used a three-round format. In each round, the fencers were divided into pools to play a round-robin within the pool. Bouts were to five touches. Barrages were used to break ties necessary for advancement (touches against were the first tie-breaker used to give ranks when the rank did not matter). However, only as much fencing was done as was necessary to determine advancement, so some bouts never occurred if the fencers advancing from the pool could be determined. Standard foil rules were used, including that touches had to be made with the tip of the foil, the target area was limited to the torso, and priority determined the winner of double touches.

 Quarterfinals: There were 4 pools of 8 fencers each. The top 4 fencers in each quarterfinal advanced to the semifinals.
 Semifinals: There were 2 pools of 8 fencers each. The top 4 fencers in each semifinal advanced to the final.
 Final: The final pool had 8 fencers.

Schedule

All times are Australian Eastern Standard Time (UTC+10)

Results

Quarterfinals

The top 4 fencers in each pool advanced to the semifinals.

Quarterfinal 1

Quarterfinal 2

Stratmann won the barrage vs. Mangiarotti, 5–4.

Quarterfinal 3

Delaunois beat Paul, who beat Bergamini, who beat Delaunois, in the barrage, all at 5–4; touches against in the main pool were used to break the tie.

Quarterfinal 4

Semifinals

The top 4 fencers in each pool advanced to the final.

Semifinal 1

Semifinal 2

The three-way barrage for 3rd and 4th places resulted in Stratmann losing twice to be eliminated. Gyuricza and Jay did not face each other in the barrage, with their nominal 3rd and 4th place ranks (not relevant to advancement) determined on touches against in the main pool.

Final

The two Italian fencers faced off in a barrage to determine silver and bronze medals. Bergamini won, 5–4 (he had also beaten Spallino by that score in the main pool).

References

Foil men
Men's events at the 1956 Summer Olympics